The Amt am Peenestrom is an Amt in the district of Vorpommern-Greifswald, in Mecklenburg-Vorpommern, Germany. The seat of the Amt is in Wolgast.

The Amt am Peenestrom consists of the following municipalities:
Buggenhagen
Krummin
Lassan
Lütow
Sauzin
Wolgast
Zemitz

References

Ämter in Mecklenburg-Western Pomerania